Sonnet 121 is one of 154 sonnets written by the English playwright and poet William Shakespeare. It is a member of the Fair Youth sequence, in which the poet expresses his love towards his young lover.

Synopsis
The poet condemns hypocrisy and decides he's going to be himself.

Hypocrites force you to lose out on life's fair pleasures.

They are bad by pointing out your faultsult may actually be a good thing.

You have to hide your pleasurable pursuits from them.

Unless they realize that all people are bad (and presumably they will stop being hypocrites)

Structure 
Sonnet 121 is an English or Shakespearean sonnet. The English sonnet has three quatrains, followed by a final rhyming couplet. It follows the typical rhyme scheme of the form ABAB CDCD EFEF GG and is composed in iambic pentameter, a type of poetic metre based on five pairs of metrically weak/strong syllabic positions. The 1st line exemplifies a regular iambic pentameter:

  ×   /  ×   /  ×  /     ×   /   ×  / 
'Tis better to be vile than vile esteem'd, (121.1)

Four lines (2, 4, 9, and 11) have a final extrametrical syllable or feminine ending, as for example:

 /   × ×    /  ×     /   × /  ×     /(×) 
Not by our feeling, but by others' seeing: (121.4)
/ = ictus, a metrically strong syllabic position. × = nonictus. (×) = extrametrical syllable.

Line 4 (above) also exhibits another common metrical variation, an initial reversal. Initial reversals are potentially present in lines 7, 8, and 11. The 3rd line features one (potentially two; the second can be otherwise scanned) rightward movements of an ictus (resulting in a four-position figure, × × / /, sometimes referred to as a minor ionic):

×     ×  /     /  ×    /      ×   ×   /  / 
And the just pleasure lost, which is so deem'd (121.3)

A similar minor ionic is potentially present in line 12's "By their rank thoughts", though not if "their" receives contrastive accent.

The meter demands that line 13's "general" function as two syllables.

Notes

References

External links
 Shakespeare's Sonnets online

British poems
Sonnets by William Shakespeare